Bernhard Rieger  (born 17 December 1922; died 10 April 2013 in Kressbronn) was a German Prelate of the Roman Catholic Church.

Rieger was born in Wißgoldingen, Germany and was ordained a priest on 29 July 1951. Rieger was appointed bishop to the Diocese of Rottenburg-Stuttgart on 20 December 1984 as well as titular bishop of Tigava and ordained bishop on 2 February 1985. Reiger retired from Rottenburg-Stuttgart Diocese on 31 July 1996.

See also
 Diocese of Rottenburg-Stuttgart

References

External links
 Catholic-Hierarchy
 Rottenburg-Stuttgart Diocese (German)

20th-century German Roman Catholic bishops
German Roman Catholic titular bishops
1922 births
2013 deaths
20th-century German Roman Catholic priests